French Kiss is a 2011 French-language Canadian romantic comedy directed by Sylvain Archambault.

Plot
Frédérik (Claude Legault) is a businessman prone to flirting. Meeting Juliette (Céline Bonnier), a lonely librarian, he tries the old pick-up line: "Haven't we met somewhere before?" To his surprise, Juliet mistakes him a former colleague named Robert. Frédérik has trapped himself and plays along pretending to be Robert.

References

External links
 

2011 films
2011 romantic comedy films
Canadian romantic comedy films
Films directed by Sylvain Archambault
French-language Canadian films
2010s Canadian films